San Jose Maverick (later Maverick) was an underground newspaper published in San Jose, California monthly from Feb. 1969 to Fall 1970. A total of 16 issues were published, in a tabloid format. Connected with the Bay Area Revolutionary Union and its local faction headed by Stanford University English professor H. Bruce Franklin, the Maverick was labor-oriented, and printed some articles in Spanish. Bruce Franklin contributed a number of articles under the pseudonym "Will B. Outlaw", including one entitled "The AK-47 vs. the M-16: Why the Capitalist Gun Is Inferior". In its second year of publication the paper shortened its title to Maverick starting with the Feb. 1970 issue (vol. 2, no. 2).

See also
 List of underground newspapers of the 1960s counterculture

Notes

Defunct newspapers published in California
Newspapers published in San Jose, California